Gao Erwei (born 15 May 1968) is a Chinese judoka. He competed in the men's half-lightweight event at the 1992 Summer Olympics.

References

1968 births
Living people
Chinese male judoka
Olympic judoka of China
Judoka at the 1992 Summer Olympics
People from Shanxi
Sportspeople from Shanxi
People from Xinzhou
Judoka at the 1990 Asian Games
Asian Games medalists in judo
Asian Games bronze medalists for China
Medalists at the 1990 Asian Games
20th-century Chinese people